Gino Borsoi (born March 11, 1974 in Motta di Livenza, Italy) is a retired Grand Prix motorcycle road racer.

Borsoi is currently the Sporting Director of the Aspar Team.

Races by year

(key) (Races in bold indicate pole position) (Races in italics indicate fastest lap)

References 

1974 births
Living people
People from Motta di Livenza
Italian motorcycle racers
125cc World Championship riders
Sportspeople from the Province of Treviso